is a Japanese new religion originated from Shinto. It is headquartered at 101 Suwa 2-chōme, Toyokawa, Aichi, Japan.

References 

Religious organizations established in 1948
Japanese new religions
1948 establishments in Japan
Shinto new religious movements